Custom House Square (Stylised as CHSq) is an outdoor music event held in Custom House Square, Belfast. 2017 was the first year of CHSq but events have been held at this venue before such as the Belsonic music festival back in 2014. The capacity of this event is 5,000.

The 2022 event is due to include Simple Minds (rescheduled from 2021).

2018
CHSq 2018 was announced to return in 2018 with the first headlining act to be Rag’n’Bone Man with support. 8 more headliners were announced in the coming weeks and months along with their supporting acts. Kasabian are to return to CHSq in 2018 after last years concert was cancelled minutes before they were to take to the stage "due to illness".

2017
CHSq 2017 was announced in March with acts being added to the line-up every couple of weeks. It was announced via CHSq's social media that the August 20th show with headlining act Oliver Heldens would be cancelled due to "scheduling difficulties", they also announced that another date would be announced for Winter 2017 in due course to make up for the inconveniences caused. Kasabian's concert was cancelled minutes before they were to take to the stage "due to illness", organisers say they are going to reschedule the concert.

References

External links 
 

Music in Belfast
Rock festivals in Ireland
Music festivals in Northern Ireland
Festivals in Belfast